2016 Myanmar earthquake

 April 2016 Myanmar earthquake - magnitude 6.9
 August 2016 Myanmar earthquake - magnitude 6.8

See also
List of earthquakes in 2016